Leucosioidea is a superfamily of crabs containing the two families Leucosiidae and Iphiculidae.

References

Crabs
Arthropod superfamilies